Thomas Merrill Ferrell (June 20, 1844 – October 20, 1916) was an American Democratic Party politician who represented New Jersey's 1st congressional district in the United States House of Representatives for one term from 1883 to 1885.

Born in Glassboro, New Jersey, Ferrell attended the common schools and completed an academic course.

Political career
Ferrell was elected a member of the Glassboro township committee in 1872 and 1873. He served as president of Hollow Ware Glassworkers' Association from 1878 to 1883.

He served as member of the school board 1885–1890, serving as its president in 1887. He served as member of the New Jersey General Assembly in 1879 and 1880, and as a member of the New Jersey Senate in 1880 and 1881.

Congress
Ferrell was elected as a Democrat to the Forty-eighth Congress, serving in office from March 4, 1883 to March 3, 1885, but was an unsuccessful candidate for reelection in 1884 to the Forty-ninth Congress.

Later career and death
After leaving Congress, he was employed as a glassware salesman.

He died in Glassboro, New Jersey, October 20, 1916, and was interred in Methodist Episcopal Cemetery.

External links

Thomas Merrill Ferrell at The Political Graveyard

1844 births
1916 deaths
Democratic Party New Jersey state senators
Democratic Party members of the New Jersey General Assembly
People from Glassboro, New Jersey
Democratic Party members of the United States House of Representatives from New Jersey
Politicians from Gloucester County, New Jersey
19th-century American politicians